is a female Japanese manga artist. She has been creating manga since her debut title Ten no Otoshimono first released in 2004. She is also notable as the artist for the manga version of Key's visual novel Tomoyo After: It's a Wonderful Life, and she also illustrated the fourth Clannad manga.

Works
Clannad: Tomoyo Dearest
Reverse / End
Tamago no Kimi.
Ten no Otoshimono
Tomoyo After: Dear Shining Memories
Black Gate

External links
Yukiko Sumiyoshi's personal website 

1982 births
Living people
Manga artists from Chiba Prefecture